Bari Sardo is a comune (municipality) in the Province of Nuoro in the Italian region Sardinia, located about 120 km northeast of Cagliari and about  south of Tortolì.

Bari Sardo borders the following municipalities: Cardedu, Ilbono, Lanusei, Loceri, Tortolì.

References 

Cities and towns in Sardinia